Maryam Heydarzadeh (born November 20, 1977) is a contemporary Iranian poet, lyricist, singer and painter.

Heydarzadeh is blind. She writes simple, yet deep poetry, almost always about the state of being in love. Some Iranian singers have created songs using her poetry.

Lyrics

References

External links 
Official home page of Maryam Heydarzadeh

1977 births
Living people
21st-century Iranian women singers
Iranian blind people
Iranian lyricists
Iranian pop singers
Blind writers
Blind musicians
Iranian women poets
20th-century Iranian women writers
20th-century Iranian poets
21st-century Iranian women writers
21st-century Iranian poets
Poets from Tehran